Menegazzia dissoluta is a species of corticolous (bark-dwelling), foliose lichen found in Papua New Guinea. It was formally described as a new species in 2001 by lichenologists Peter Wilfred James, André Aptroot, Emmanuël Sérusiaux, and Paul Diederich. The species epithet dissoluta refers to the "irregularly finely wrinkled upper surface that dissolves into soredia".

See also
List of Menegazzia species

References

dissoluta
Lichen species
Lichens described in 2001
Lichens of New Guinea
Taxa named by André Aptroot
Taxa named by Emmanuël Sérusiaux
Taxa named by Peter Wilfred James